Nicholas Purcell (by 1503 – will proved 1559) was an English politician.

He was a Member (MP) of the Parliament of England for Shrewsbury in 1539, 1545, March 1553, October 1553, April 1554, 1555 and 1558.

References

1559 deaths
Year of birth uncertain
English MPs 1539–1540
English MPs 1545–1547
English MPs 1553 (Edward VI)
English MPs 1553 (Mary I)
English MPs 1554
English MPs 1555
English MPs 1558